Gifan-e Bala (also Romanized as Gīfān-e Bālā; also known as Gīfān and Bālādeh) is a village in Gifan Rural District, Garmkhan District, Bojnord County, North Khorasan Province, Iran. At the 2006 census, its population was 575, in 174 families.

References 

Populated places in Bojnord County